In geometry, a 9-simplex is a self-dual regular 9-polytope. It has 10 vertices, 45 edges, 120 triangle faces, 210 tetrahedral cells, 252 5-cell 4-faces, 210 5-simplex 5-faces, 120 6-simplex 6-faces, 45 7-simplex 7-faces, and 10 8-simplex 8-faces.  Its dihedral angle is cos−1(1/9), or approximately 83.62°.

It can also be called a decayotton, or deca-9-tope, as a 10-facetted polytope in 9-dimensions.. The name decayotton is derived from deca for ten facets in Greek and yotta (a variation of "oct" for eight), having 8-dimensional facets, and -on.

Coordinates 

The Cartesian coordinates of the vertices of an origin-centered regular decayotton having edge length 2 are:

More simply, the vertices of the 9-simplex can be positioned in 10-space as permutations of (0,0,0,0,0,0,0,0,0,1). This construction is based on facets of the 10-orthoplex.

Images

References
 Coxeter, H.S.M.: 
 
 
 (Paper 22) 
 (Paper 23) 
 (Paper 24)

External links 
 
 Polytopes of Various Dimensions
 Multi-dimensional Glossary

9-polytopes